Lift fan is an aircraft configuration in which lifting fans are located in large holes in an otherwise conventional fixed wing  or fuselage. It is used for V/STOL operation.

The aircraft takes off using the fans to provide lift, then transitions to fixed-wing lift in forward flight. Several experimental craft have been flown, but only the F-35 Lightning II entered into production.

History

A number of experimental aircraft were evaluated in the USA during the late 1950s and throughout much of the 1960s.

The Republic Aviation AP-100 was a prototype VTOL 6x General Electric J85 Turbojet engined nuclear capable strike fighter concept designed by Alexander Kartveli that had 3x ducted fans in the centre of its fuselage and tail as a possible contender for the TFX Program.

The Avro Canada Avrocar, commissioned by the USA, was intended to be a technology demonstrator for a supersonic VTOL aircraft. It featured a single central fan in a circular flying wing, with engine thrust directed rearwards for forward flight. It underwent trials between 1958 and 1961 but, due to its unstable "flying saucer" aerodynamics and lower than expected thrust, never flew out of ground effect. The Verticraft Verticar of 1961 was a similar single-fan, directed-thrust, all-wing (or lifting body) aircraft, of conventional but very low-aspect-ratio wing planform. It failed to fly. A tandem-fan version was proposed but never built. By contrast the Ryan XV-5 Vertifan of 1964 was an otherwise conventional delta-wing jet. It had a large fan in each wing and a third, smaller fan in the nose to provide balance in pitch. It was more successful, with one of the two prototypes flying until 1971.

The Vanguard C2 and C2D Omniplane had two fans side by side, with one in each wing. It underwent tethered trials between 1959 and 1962 but never flew untethered. In the late 1960s NASA conducted wind tunnel experiments on a series of larger aircraft designs using different numbers of fans in the wings.

Beginning with a one-sixth scale model in 1962, Paul Moller has been experimenting with the flying saucer configuration ever since. All have had a central cockpit but have varied between a single lift fan surrounding the cockpit, twin fans behind the cockpit or, more recently, eight individual fans distributed around it. Some examples such as the XM-2 of 1965 have been able to hover within ground effect. The artificially stabilised M200X was re-engined in 1989 and can fly out of ground effect, but has not entered production.

Several projects were announced in 2010 and 2011. The Ray passenger aircraft had four fans arranged approximately in a square, similarly to a quadrotor, with a small fan in front of a larger one behind it in each wing.  The Lockheed Martin VARIOUS was a multi-role military UAV with twin fans side by side, one in each wing. The Northrop MUVR ship-to-shore resupply aircraft similarly had a fan in each wing. 
Unlike these the Anglo-Italian AgustaWestland Project Zero hybrid tiltrotor/lift-fan unmanned technology demonstrator was actually built and flew successfully in 2011. It has side by side twin fans which can rotate into a vertical plane to act as propellers in forward flight, while still located within the wing structure.

The F-35 Lightning II uses the Rolls-Royce LiftSystem, in which 29,000 hp is diverted forward through a driveshaft from the engine's low-pressure (LP) turbine via a clutch and bevel-gearbox to a vertically mounted, contra-rotating lift fan located forward of the main engine.

Israeli enterprise Urban Aeronautics is developing a wingless drone that uses a pair of lift fans  to ensure lift by ground effect and another pair of fans for forward flight.

Table of lift fan aircraft

See also
 Lift jet
 VTOL

References
.

 
VTOL aircraft
Aircraft configurations